Events from the year 1965 in North Korea.

Incumbents
Premier: Kim Il-sung 
Supreme Leader: Kim Il-sung

Births

 4 November - Ri Yong-ae.

Events

See also
Years in Japan
Years in South Korea

References

 
North Korea
1960s in North Korea
Years of the 20th century in North Korea
North Korea